Graham Turnock is a British physicist who served as the Chief Executive Officer of the UK Space Agency from March 2017 to September 2021.

Career 
Turnock holds a PhD in Particle Physics from Cambridge University for his work at European Organization for Nuclear Research. For 15 years, he worked in HM Treasury, notably as leader of the Transport Spending Team. Before joining the UK Space Agency as Chief Executive Officer, Turnock served as Director of Better Regulation in the Department for Business, Energy and Industrial Strategy.

Turnock served as the Chief Executive Officer of the UK Space Agency from March 2017 to September 2021. During this time, he attempted to gain closer relationships with the Australian Space Agency via Sabre, a synergetic air-breathing rocket engine under development by British company Reaction Engines.

During Brexit negotiations, he warned that if the United Kingdom was expelled from the Galileo program, it would set it back by years and cost the European Union billions.

Cycling Career

Graham Turnock has won the Grace Blackman Cup in 2017

Personal life 
Turnock serves as a trustee of the Youth Hostels Association.

References 

British physicists
Living people
Year of birth missing (living people)
British space scientists
Particle physicists
British nuclear physicists
British civil servants
École nationale d'administration alumni